Kenji Koyano (小谷野 顕治, born June 22, 1988) is a Japanese football player. He plays for Mito HollyHock.

Club career statistics
Updated to 23 February 2016.

References

External links

Albirex Niigata

1988 births
Living people
Association football people from Ibaraki Prefecture
Japanese footballers
J1 League players
J2 League players
J3 League players
Kashima Antlers players
Albirex Niigata players
Mito HollyHock players
Gainare Tottori players
Association football midfielders